Rising Sun is a 1993 American buddy cop crime thriller film directed by Philip Kaufman, who also wrote the screenplay with Michael Crichton and Michael Backes. The film stars Sean Connery (who was also an executive producer), Wesley Snipes, Harvey Keitel, Tia Carrere and Cary-Hiroyuki Tagawa. It was based on Michael Crichton's 1992 novel of the same name.

Plot
During a commencement gala at the newly opened Los Angeles headquarters of Nakamoto, a Japanese keiretsu, a call girl named Cheryl Lynn Austin, is found dead, apparently after a violent sexual encounter. Police Detectives Webster "Web" Smith and John Connor, a former police captain and expert on Japanese affairs, are sent to act as liaison between the Japanese executives and the investigating officer, Smith's former partner Tom Graham. During the initial investigation, Connor and Smith review surveillance camera footage, and realize that one of the discs is missing.

Smith and Connor suspect Eddie Sakamura, Cheryl's boyfriend and agent of a Nakamoto rival, of killing her, and interrogate him at a house party. Sakamura promises to bring Connor something, and Connor reluctantly lets him go after confiscating his passport. Ishihara, a Nakamoto employee whom Connor had previously interrogated, delivers the missing disc, which clearly shows Sakamura killing Cheryl. Graham and Smith lead a SWAT raid on Sakamura's house. He tries to flee in a Vector W8 sports car, but crashes and is killed.

Smith learns that Sakamura had attempted to contact him about the missing disc, so he and Connor take the disc to an expert, Jingo Asakuma, who reveals that the disc has been digitally altered to implicate Sakamura.

Nakamoto is in the midst of sensitive negotiations for the acquisition of an American semiconductor company, with Senator John Morton, a guest at the party, abruptly changing his stance on a bill that would prevent the merger from going through. Suspecting his sudden shift is somehow related to the murder, Connor and Smith attempt to interview him at his campaign office, but without success. Upon returning to Smith's apartment, the duo find Sakamura alive and well. He reveals that he was being tailed that day by Tanaka, a Nakamoto security agent attempting to locate the original disc. Not wanting to be seen with Sakamura, Tanaka stole his sports car and committed suicide by crashing it. Sakamura gives Connor the original disc, but before he can leave, Lt. Graham arrives with Ishihara. Sakamura is killed fighting off Ishihara's men, and Smith is shot and left for dead, surviving only thanks to a bulletproof vest.

After being interrogated, Smith is put on paid leave due to an ongoing investigation of an earlier corruption charge. Regrouping with Connor and Jingo, the three view the original surveillance footage, which shows Senator Morton performing erotic asphyxiation on Cheryl. Falsely believing he killed her, Morton changes his position on the regulation bill to stay in Nakamoto's good graces. After leaving the boardroom, the footage shows another figure approaching and killing Cheryl by strangulation.

Hoping to draw the killer out, Connor and Smith fax Morton stills of the footage showing his involvement in the murder. Morton contacts Ishihara, revealing the executive to be in on the cover-up, and then Morton commits suicide. Connor, Smith, and Jingo interrupt the merger negotiations to show Nakamoto President Yoshida the surveillance footage. Bob Richmond, an American lawyer working for Nakamoto, reveals that he is the real killer and tries to run away, only to be killed by Eddie Sakamura's yakuza friends.

Yoshida maintains his and his colleagues' innocence, quietly exiling Ishihara to a desk job back in Japan. Smith drives Jingo home, where she casts doubt on whether Richmond was really the murderer, or if he was simply taking the fall to protect someone higher up in the company.

Cast

Sean Connery as Captain John Connor
Wesley Snipes as Lieutenant Webster "Web" Smith
Harvey Keitel as Lieutenant Tom Graham
Cary-Hiroyuki Tagawa as Eddie Sakamura
Kevin Anderson as Bob Richmond
Mako as Mr. Yoshida
Ray Wise as Senator John Morton
Stan Egi as Masao Ishihara
Stan Shaw as Phillips
Tia Carrere as Jingo Asakuma
Steve Buscemi as Willy "The Weasel" Wilhelm
Tatjana Patitz as Cheryl Lynn Austin
Tylyn John as the Redhead mistress of Eddie Sakamura
Peter Crombie as Greg
Sam Lloyd as Rick
Alexandra Powers as Julia
Daniel Von Bargen as Chief Olson / Interrogator
Lauren Robinson as Zelly
Amy Hill as Hsieh
Tom Dahlgren as Jim Donaldson
Clyde Kusatsu as Shoji Tanaka
Michael Chapman as Fred Hoffman
Joey Miyashima and Nelson Mashita as Young Japanese Negotiators
Tamara Tunie as Lauren
Tony Ganios as Doorman Guard (Perry)

Production

Development and writing
Michael Crichton was paid $1 million for the filming rights of his novel, and was also attached to write the screenplay alongside Michael Backes. After delivering a faithful draft, studio 20th Century Fox asked for a rewrite. Crichton then entered disputes with director Philip Kaufman, who asked for five separate rewrites. Crichton also was not in favor of the decision by Kaufman and Joe Roth to cast Wesley Snipes as the protagonist, therefore changing the character's race from Caucasian to African-American. Crichton argued: ”In a movie about U.S.-Japan relations, if you cast someone who’s black, you introduce another aspect because of tension between blacks and Japanese.”

Kaufman wound up taking the writing duties, with David Mamet also delivering a draft. Kaufman tried to get a sole screenwriter credit, but the Writer's Guild arbitration decided that his contributions were not enough to deny a credit to Crichton and Backes. Given Kaufman had a tendency for long movies, Fox made him contractually obligated to deliver a two hour length film, with editing delays pushing the film's release date forward. Rising Sun was filmed entirely in Los Angeles, California.

Reception

Box office
Rising Sun was released on 30 July 1993 in 1,510 theaters across the US. It grossed $15,195,941 (24.1% of total gross) on its opening weekend. During its run in theaters, the film grossed $63,179,523 (58.9%) in the US and $44,019,267 (41.1%) overseas for a worldwide total of $107,198,790. The film spent six weeks in the Top 10.

Critical response
On review aggregator website Rotten Tomatoes, the film has a 33% approval rating based on 40 reviews, with an average ranking of 5.1/10. On Metacritic, Rising Sun have a rank of 56 out of a 100 based on 24 critics, indicating "mixed or average reviews".

Owen Gleiberman of the Entertainment Weekly awarded the film with "C+" grade.

Richard Schickel of Time magazine wrote "The best seller's passions were misplaced, but in toning them down, the adaptation turns bland".

At the time of the film's release, it generated some controversy and protest from Asian-Americans, including Guy Aoki and other representatives of the Media Action Network for Asian Americans (MANAA), who felt the film demonized Asian people.

References

External links

1990s English-language films
1990s Japanese-language films
1993 crime thriller films
1990s buddy cop films
1990s mystery films
1990s police procedural films
20th Century Fox films
American buddy cop films
American business films
American crime thriller films
American mystery films
American police detective films
Anti-Japanese sentiment in the United States
Films about race and ethnicity
Films about suicide
Films based on American novels
Films based on crime novels
Films based on works by Michael Crichton
Films directed by Philip Kaufman
Films set in Los Angeles
Films shot in California
Films scored by Toru Takemitsu
Japan in non-Japanese culture
1993 multilingual films
American multilingual films
1990s American films